Haggart may refer to:

Alastair Haggart, British priest
Alexander Haggart (1848–1927), Canadian judge and politician
Bob Haggart (1914–1998), American musician
David Haggart (1801–1821), Scottish criminal
George Haggart, Scottish curler
John Graham Haggart (1836–1913), Canadian politician

See also
Hagart (disambiguation)